The Flattops,  el. , is a small  set of hills northeast of Hammond in Carter County, Montana, United States.

See also
 List of mountain ranges in Montana

Notes

Mountain ranges of Montana
Landforms of Carter County, Montana